Penguin Red Classics is a series of novels published by Penguin Books in the UK. There are 39 books in the series. The books are from the Penguin Classics imprint, but do not contain any introductory material or commentary, instead focussing on the story.

The books

References

See also 

Great Books of the 20th Century
Penguin Essentials
Pocket Penguins
Ten of the Best

Lists of novels
Penguin Books book series